Henry Brandon Brown (born 16 November 1994) is a South African rugby union player for the  in the Pro14. His regular position is flanker and he can also play as a lock.

Rugby career

Youth rugby

Brown was born in Port Elizabeth.

His first taste of rugby played at a nationwide level was for the  team during the 2015 Under-21 Provincial Championship. He made eight starts and three appearances as a replacement for the team playing in their first season in Group A of the competition, having won promotion from Group B in 2014. The team struggled in their first season at a higher level, winning just one match and finishing bottom of the log.

2016: NMMU Madibaz / Eastern Province Kings

He made his first class debut by coming on just before the hour mark in a 26–59 defeat in his only appearances in the competition.

After another appearance off the bench against , he made his first start against  four days later. He featured in all their remaining matches in the competition in a poor season for the team that saw the side finish bottom, losing all their matches.

Water polo

In addition to playing rugby union, Brown also played water polo in high school, earning an inclusion in an South Africa Under-19 team following a national competition held in Port Elizabeth.

One of his team mates at Grey High School was fellow future provincial rugby union player Jeremy Ward.

References

South African rugby union players
Living people
1994 births
Rugby union players from Port Elizabeth
South African people of British descent
Rugby union flankers
Eastern Province Elephants players
Southern Kings players
White South African people